The term womxn is an alternative spelling of the English word woman. Womxn, along with the term womyn,  has been found in writing since the 1970s to avoid perceived sexism in the standard spelling, which contains the word man. 

The term "womxn" has been adopted by various organizations, including student university groups in the US and UK, who call it more inclusive of trans and nonbinary people than women and other alternative spellings. Conversely, it has been criticized for being unnecessary or confusing, conflicting with the uncommonness of mxn to describe men. The use of womxn as a gender-inclusive alternative to woman has also been criticized for having the transphobic implication that trans women are not women but are a separate category (womxn).

Etymology
Man took on its additional masculine meaning in the Late Middle English period, replacing the now-obsolete word . This has created the present situation with man bearing a dual meaning—either masculine or nonspecific.

Second wave feminism developed several alternative political spellings of the word woman, such as womyn. Keridwen Luis, a sociologist at Brandeis University, states that feminists have experimented for decades to devise a suitable alternative for the term identifying the female gender. Such terms have included wimmin (in the 1990s), based upon the original Old English term, and womyn (since at least 1975).

Definition 
Dictionary.com, which added womxn and 300 other words to its dictionary in 2019, defines womxn as "used, especially in intersectional feminism, as an alternative spelling to avoid the suggestion of sexism perceived in the sequences m-a-n and m-e-n, and to be inclusive of trans and nonbinary women."

In 2017, The Boston Globe called the term "a powerful, increasingly popular label, encompassing a broader range of gender identities than 'woman'—or even older feminist terms such as 'womyn'... a nontraditional spelling for people whose gender identity doesn’t fit in the traditional boxes". In 2018, Jennie Kermode, chair of Trans Media Watch, stated that the organization would not use the term, considering that women already includes trans women. In a 2019 Styles article published in The New York Times, journalist Breena Kerr stated that while womxn was difficult to pronounce, it was "perhaps the most inclusive word yet", using a similar approach to the term "Latinx". Sociologist Nita Harker praised the term's ambiguity in pronunciation, saying that it forces users to "stop and think".

Current uses 

In 2017, the Womxn's March on Seattle chose to use the term "womxn" to promote the march. Elizabeth Hunter-Keller, the event's communications chair, told The New York Times that they chose it based upon the recommendation of a core organizer, who was a nonbinary person, and to reflect the organizing group's diversity. Hunter-Keller reported that although there were some questions, most supporters encouraged the choice.  In January 2018, Portland held the Indigenous Womxn’s March, dedicated to missing and murdered indigenous girls, women, and transgender people.

In October 2019, the Wellcome Collection, a museum and library in London, made an announcement through Twitter using the term to demonstrate their goal of including diverse perspectives; after complaints from hundreds of followers, the museum later apologized and removed the term from its website. Labour Party politician Jess Phillips responded to the incident by saying, "I've never met a trans woman who was offended by the word woman being used, so I'm not sure why this keeps happening". Clara Bradbury-Rance of King's College London conjectured that the push-back was because the use of the term was seen as too simplistic and a "fix-all".

On March 1, 2021, the streaming platform Twitch used the term "Womxn" to promote events celebrating Women's History Month. The event was announced through Twitter, which led to immediate backlash from various users who considered the term transphobic for implying that trans women are not women but a separate category (womxn). Twitch removed the tweet and apologised, stating that they wanted to use the word to acknowledge the shortcomings of gender-binary language and that they would use the term "women" moving forward.

See also 
 Feminist language reform
 Fourth-wave feminism
 LGBT linguistics
 Transfeminism
 List of transgender-related topics
 Latinx
 Womyn

References

1970s neologisms
Feminism
Feminist terminology
Nonstandard spelling
Women-related neologisms
Gender in language
Person of color
Transfeminism
Intersectional feminism
Black feminism
Linguistic controversies
LGBT-related controversies